Kirsten Lepore is an American animator, best known for her stop motion short films like "Sweet Dreams", "Bottle", and "Move Mountain". From 2014 to 2015, she worked on an episode of the American cartoon series Adventure Time entitled "Bad Jubies", serving as writer, storyboard artist, and director. The episode eventually aired on January 14, 2016 to critical acclaim.

Education
Lepore was raised in South Brunswick, New Jersey. In an interview with The A.V. Club, Lepore explained that, as a child, she was fascinated by the animation techniques used by both Disney and the Jim Henson Company. Lepore attended South Brunswick High School, where she began to earnestly explore art, and as a young adult, she earned a Bachelor of Fine Arts at Maryland Institute College of Art, where she studied "experimental animation". Her undergraduate thesis was the short stop motion film entitled "Sweet Dreams". Following college, she applied to studios and freelanced on the side, but she "never heard back from the studios, and the freelance work kept coming." She returned to her parents' house and began working on ads and small production projects. During this phase in her life, she felt that she did not have enough technical expertise. As a result, she attended CalArts, graduating in 2012 with a Master of Fine Arts in experimental animation. Her graduate thesis, a short film entitled "Move Mountain", caught the attention of Adventure Time showrunner Adam Muto, and Lepore eventually guest-animated the episode "Bad Jubies".

Accolades

Lepore has won various awards, including a Student Annie Award, a South by Southwest special jury award for animation, and an Annecy + award for best animation.

Personal life 
Lepore has been married to fellow filmmaker and animator Daniel Kwan since 2016, and together they have one son.

Selected filmography

References

External links
 
 

American animators
American animated film directors
American women film directors
American women animators
People from South Brunswick, New Jersey
South Brunswick High School (New Jersey) alumni
Stop motion animators
California Institute of the Arts alumni
Living people
Maryland Institute College of Art alumni
Year of birth missing (living people)
21st-century American women